IFIP Working Group 2.1 on Algorithmic Languages and Calculi is a working group of the International Federation for Information Processing (IFIP).

IFIP WG 2.1 was formed as the body responsible for the continued support and maintenance of the programming language ALGOL 60. The Modified Report on the Algorithmic Language ALGOL 60 and the ALGOL 68 programming language were produced by WG 2.1.

, its scope is:
 Study of calculation of programs from specifications 
 Design of notations for such calculation
 Formulation of algorithm theories, using such notations
 Investigation of software support for program derivation
 Continuing responsibility for ALGOL 60 and ALGOL 68

History

Formation
Soon after the publication of the original ALGOL 60 Report in 1960, issues arose that needed some form of authoritative resolution. ALGOL 60 had been chosen by leading scientific journal Communications of the ACM as its language for algorithms, then an important part of the items published in the Communications. Computer manufacturers and academic groups were laboring to produce implementations. There were issues that needed clarification, such as ambiguities and errors in the Report. Another urgent issue was the absence of even basic input/output (I/O) facilities.

The authors of the ALGOL 60 Report met in Rome, Italy, in April 1962 to resolve most of the ambiguities and errors known at the time, resulting in the Revised Report on the Algorithmic Language ALGOL 60. During that meeting, the authors decided to institutionalize the responsibility for the continued support and maintenance of ALGOL 60 by transferring it to the young international IFIP organization.

To this end, IFIP established a working group under its Technical Committee 2 on Programming. The initial membership consisted largely of most of the original authors, with the addition of several members responsible for ALGOL 60 implementations. IFIP WG 2.1 held its first meeting in August 1962 in Munich, Germany.

ALGOL 68

When ALGOL 60 was designed, its intended scope of use was similar to that of FORTRAN: largely the field of numerical analysis or computing. IFIP WG 2.1 embarked on the design of a successor to the ALGOL 60 programming language, code-named ALGOL X, with a much wider application scope, including nonnumerical programming, areas better served by languages like COBOL and Lisp than by ALGOL 60. Among several competing initial designs, including a proposal by Niklaus Wirth that eventually led to ALGOL W, the Working Group chose that by Aad van Wijngaarden, ultimately leading to ALGOL 68.

IFIP WG 2.1 decided to adopt the design in December 1968 during a stormy meeting, once again held in Munich. However, there was considerable opposition among the members, led by Edsger Dijkstra, expressed in a Minority Report. This led to a split in the group and the formation of a new working group, IFIP Working Group 2.3 on Programming Methodology.

Notable members, former and current
WG 2.1 has, and has had, many members. Some are the subject of Wikipedia articles:

 Roland Carl Backhouse
 Friedrich L. Bauer
 Richard Bird
 Stephen R. Bourne
 Robert Dewar
 Edsger W. Dijkstra
 Andrey Ershov
 Robert W. Floyd
 Jeremy Gibbons
 David Gries
 Eric Hehner
 Tony Hoare
 Charles Katz
 Cornelis H. A. Koster
 Peter Landin
 Charles H. Lindsey
 Yanhong Annie Liu
 Peter Lucas
 Conor McBride
 John McCarthy
 Tom Maibaum
 Barry J. Mailloux
 Lambert Meertens
 Carroll Morgan
 Peter Naur
 Maurice Nivat
 Manfred Paul
 John E. L. Peck
 Willem van der Poel
 Brian Randell
 Douglas T. Ross
 Heinz Rutishauser
 Klaus Samelson
 Jacob T. Schwartz
 Micha Sharir
 Michel Sintzoff
 David Turner
 Eiiti Wada
 Joseph Henry Wegstein
 Adriaan van Wijngaarden
 Niklaus Wirth
 Mike Woodger
 Nobuo Yoneda

See also

References

External links

Algol programming language family
International Federation for Information Processing